Leptomys is a genus of rodent endemic to New Guinea.  It is considered part of the New Guinea Old Endemics, meaning it was part of the first wave of murine rodents to colonize the island. Leptomys are seen to have minimal adaptations to their aquatic life style. Elongated hind feet accompanied by elongated centre toes suggest the ability to leap. The third molar which is lost is many rodents is retained but smaller in size. Small eyes and ears can be seen amongst its velvety soft fur.

Species
 Leptomys arfakensis Musser, Helgen & Lunde, 2008
 Long-footed water rat, Leptomys elegans
 Ernst Mayr's water rat, Leptomys ernstmayri
 Leptomys paulus Musser, Helgen & Lunde, 2008
 Fly River water rat, Leptomys signatus

References
Musser, G. G. and M. D. Carleton. 2005. Superfamily Muroidea. pp. 894–1531 in Mammal Species of the World a Taxonomic and Geographic Reference. D. E. Wilson and D. M. Reeder eds. Johns Hopkins University Press, Baltimore.
Musser G.G., Helgen K.M., and Lunde D.P.  2008.  Systematic review of New Guinea Leptomys (Muridae, Murinae) with descriptions of two new species. AMERICAN MUSEUM NOVITATES, 3624:1-60.

 
Rodent genera
Taxa named by Oldfield Thomas